Eupalamides boliviensis is a moth in the Castniidae family. It is found in Bolivia.

References

Moths described in 1917
Castniidae